Pegon may refer to:

 Pegon alphabet
 Pegon, Homalin, Burma
 Pegon (24°23"N 95°50"E), Banmauk, Burma
 Pegon (24°23"N 95°33"E), Banmauk, Burma